CJOB (680 kHz) is a commercial AM radio station in Winnipeg, Manitoba, Canada. It is owned and operated by Corus Radio and airs a news/talk format with news and sports programs. CJOB and its sister stations, CFPG-FM, CJKR-FM, and CKND-DT, have studios and offices at 201 Portage in Winnipeg.

The transmitter tower array is located off Floodway Road near Saint Adolphe.  CJOB operates at 50,000 watts (the highest power permitted for Canadian AM stations), but because 680 kHz is a clear channel frequency, CJOB must use a directional antenna at all times to avoid interfering with other stations. Even with this restriction, CJOB's low frequency, transmitter power, and Manitoba's mostly flat land (with near-perfect ground conductivity) allow it to reach almost all of Manitoba during the day.

Programming
CJOB airs local talk shows during the day, with news-intensive segments during AM and PM drive time. Evenings, CJOB has a sports talk show, and at night, CJOB carries two national shows, "Charles Adler Tonight" and "The Shift with Drex." Weekends feature shows on health, travel, food, technology and cars.

The station broadcasts play-by-play coverage of several sports teams, including the Winnipeg Blue Bombers and Manitoba Moose. CJOB was a broadcaster of the original Winnipeg Jets of the WHA and NHL prior to their relocation to Glendale, Arizona in 1996. On October 5, 2020, the current incarnation of the team announced that it would move its radio broadcasts to CJOB under a seven-year deal. CJKR-FM will simulcast all Jets broadcasts on FM.

History 
CJOB first signed on at 8 a.m. Monday, March 11, 1946. CJOB was a 250-watt station at 1340 kHz owned by John Oliver Blick (the "JOB" in the call sign)

The station moved to 680 kHz and increased its power to 5,000 watts on October 8, 1957.

In 1959 CJOB applied to the Board of Broadcast Governors (BBG), under the name Perimeter Television Broadcasters Ltd., to build Winnipeg's first private television station, but were unsuccessful. The licence was issued to Moffat Broadcasting, which put CJAY-TV on the air in November 1960.

The station moved in October 1962 to 930 Portage Avenue, temporarily sharing space with Sun Life, who moved to Broadway.

CJOB was sold to OB Limited in 1964.

In 1978 CJOB's broadcast power increased to 50,000 watts during the daytime, making it the province's second-most powerful station, after 990 CBW, powered at 50,000 watts day and night.

In 1998 CJOB was sold to Western International Communications.

In 2000 CJOB was sold to Corus Entertainment.

In 2006 the station celebrated 60 years on-the-air.

February 9, 2006 CJOB launches AIR680 Chopper, in partnership with MB Lottery's Corp. and contracted with the Canadian Traffic Network, Winnipeg's only helicopter traffic reports  

In 2007 CJOB asked the Canadian Radio-television and Telecommunications Commission (CRTC) for a nested FM frequency at 106.3 transmitter at Starbuck to rebroadcast CJOB (AM) (mono). On September 7, the 
CRTC denied Corus's application to simulcast the AM radio signal at 106.3 MHz.

In April 2010, Corus Radio Winnipeg announced the future relocation of its radio broadcast facility to 1440 Rapelje Avenue (since renamed Jack Blick Avenue, after the station's founder), as part of a lease agreement between Corus Entertainment and Cadillac Fairview. The relocation to Polo Park was originally slated for January 2011. CJOB 680, CJGV-FM 99.1 (Groove FM) and CJKR-FM 97.5 (Power 97) would become the anchor tenants. At the time, general manager Garth Buchko said the stations had outgrown their 930 Portage Avenue facility. With the move, Corus Radio Winnipeg would also upgrade to state-of-the-art, fully digital on-air systems.

At the end of February 2011, CJOB completed the move to its new location at 1440 Jack Blick Avenue.

On March 11, 2011, CJOB celebrated 65 years on-the-air.

In the spring of 2015, CJOB lost its long-held first place status as Winnipeg's highest-rated radio station to CBC Radio One station 990 CBW.

In September 2017, CJOB cancelled a five-year contract with the Canadian Traffic Network, grounding Winnipeg's only news and traffic reporting helicopter, known as Skyview-1. Skyview-1's debut had coincided with the launch on February 6, 2012 of Global TV's The Morning News program, which aired from 6-9 am.

Rebroadcasters 
CJOB also has rebroadcasters in the following communities:

CFIL-FM 97.1 - Gillam
CJEN-FM 96.1 - Jenpeg
CHGG-FM 96.1 - Limestone

CJOB is also available on Shaw Direct satellite channel 861.

References

External links 
Global News Radio 680 CJOB

Job
Job
Job
Radio stations established in 1946
1946 establishments in Manitoba